Anand Kumar (born 11 August 1961) is an Indian bureaucrat and the current Secretary of the Ministry of New and Renewable Energy in the Government of India. He is an officer of the batch of 1984 from the Kerala cadre of Indian Administrative Service.

Education 
Anand Kumar holds an M.Phil with Distinction from the University of Delhi and an MBA degree from the University of Queensland, Australia. He has also earned a bachelor's and master's degree in Zoology.

Career 
Anand Kumar began his career in 1984 as a district collector and magistrate of Idukki and Calicut districts in Kerala. During the Kuwait-Iraq war of 1990, Anand was assigned the duty of managing the relief camps on Iraq-Amman border and supervised the repatriation of Indians. Anand has served as a Deputy Election Commissioner in the Election Commission of India between 2004–06 and was responsible for conducting the historic Bihar Legislative Assembly elections in 2005. Before taking up his current role at the Ministry of New and Renewable Energy, Government of India, Anand Kumar served as Joint Secretary at the Ministry of Tourism. He was also the Managing Director at National Highways Infrastructure Development Corporation Limited (NHIDCL) in 2014.

Awards and recognition 

 National Award for e- Governance 2018- 2019
 SKOCH AWARD (National Significance)
 Handel Emigration Formalities
 Lal Bahadur Shastri National Academy of Administration

References 

1961 births
Living people
University of Queensland alumni
Delhi University alumni